The Texas Blazers is a men's honorary service organization at The University of Texas at Austin. The organization was founded September 7, 1994, on the patio of the Texas Union by a group of men desiring to create an organization on campus committed to a more “hands-on” approach to service.   Members are distinguished for their active leadership roles on campus and within the UT community. The organizational pillars are: commitment to campus spirit and traditions, service, scholarship. The organization is led by an elected Chairman and ten other executive board members. The organization is known for selecting members holding prominent roles within student politics and leadership positions within similar spirit groups on campus. The Texas Blazers' sister organization is the Orange Jackets, an accomplished group of women who also serve as official hosts for the university during on-campus events and conferences. The Texas Blazers is one of the nine original spirit groups within the Texas Roundtable.

Purpose 
The Texas Blazers have stated that the purpose of the organization is to:
 Support the greater Austin community through service.
 Uphold and promote the spirit and traditions of The University of Texas.
 Serve The University of Texas and campus community by exhibiting campus leadership while maintaining high standards of academic excellence.

History 
The Texas Blazers was founded September 7, 1994, on the patio of the Texas Union by a group of men who wanted to create an organization committed to a “hands-on” approach to service that included high standards of academics, leadership, and spirited support of the University. The founders also desired the Texas Blazers to be an organization that was a strong representation of the student body in order to better serve the University. These student leaders came from various student organizations across campus to perform service for the UT and Austin communities. Finally, the founding members desired an organization free of hazing and other activities unbecoming of a quality student organization.

Awards
In 1994, UT recognized the Texas Blazers with the “Most Outstanding Service Organization” award at the UT Swing-Out Awards. In 2003, the Texas Blazers were named the “Most Outstanding Organization” at the UT Swing-Out Awards.

In 2007, the Texas Blazers created the “Texas Blazers Endowed Scholarship” at The University of Texas.

Honors and awards
 1994 Swing Out award as UT's “Best Service Organization"
 2003 Swing Out award as UT's “Best Service Organization"
 2009 Swing Out Award as UT's "Best Service Organization"
 2014 Swing Out award as UT's “Best Service Organization"
 2014 Tower Award for "Outstanding Student Organization"
 2014 Eastside Memorial High School’s Official Business Partner of the year
 2015 Tower Award for "Most Outstanding Student Organization"
 2015 Tower Award for "Outstanding Service Project"
 2015 Swing Out Award as UT's "Best Spirit Organization"
 2015 Swing Out Award as UT's "Best Organizational Ethics"
 2015 Swing Out Award as UT's "Most Outstanding Organization"
 2016 Swing Out Award as UT's "Best Service Organization"
 2016 Swing Out Award as UT's "Best Organizational Ethics"
 2017 Swing Out Award as UT's "Best Spirit Organization"

Past Texas Blazers Chairs

External links
Blazers Website
Blazers Documentary Website

University of Texas at Austin
Student societies in the United States
Service organizations based in the United States
1994 establishments in Texas